"Custer" is a single by American heavy metal band Slipknot. Released on October 10, 2014, it is the third single from their fifth studio album .5: The Gray Chapter.

Composition 
The song begins with percussionist Shawn Crahan describing what the tempo of the song should be.  The track then quickly transgresses into one that is much more deep and forceful, opening the composition. The song contains lead vocalist Corey Taylor speaking in the manner of a radio announcer, and the line "Cut, cut, cut me up and fuck, fuck, fuck me up". During concerts, percussionist Chris Fehn would usually sing the chorus with Corey.

Critical reception 
Metal Hammer describes the work as having "an air of the self-titled about it with Sid's scratching in the background and almost poem-esque opening verse".  ArtistDirect describes the tune as "'Surfacing 2015' with a massive refrain and Faith No More-esque groove that burns and blazes with evil and engaging panache." The Guardian praised "Custer" as well as "Sarcastrophe", noting "some huge choruses lurking within the repurposed death metal riffs and tribal clatter"

Charts

References 

Slipknot (band) songs
2014 songs
2015 singles
Roadrunner Records singles
Songs written by Corey Taylor
Songs written by Jim Root